is a former Japanese football player.

Career

Early years
Born in Tokyo, and after receiving as professor of History and Religion, Miyoshi went to Argentina to try their luck, because he wanted to devote himself fully to football. He was given an opportunity through Martín Cardetti business group, so in 2008 he went to Estudiantes de la Plata, a prestigious team, not only in Argentina but in South America, but we lacked opportunities. In the first half of 2009, he look for chances in Arsenal de Sarandí and at the end of 2009 he went to Argentino de Rosario, playing in the Primera D, but unfortunately he was not taken into account, so he only trained with the team.

Boston River
In mid-2010, Miyoshi signed for Uruguayan Segunda División side Boston River, where he made a total of 35 appearances and scored 3 goals.

Shimizu S-Pulse
In mid-2012, he was transferred to J1 League side Shimizu S-Pulse.

References

External links

 Profile at Soccerway

1985 births
Living people
Asia University (Japan) alumni
Association football people from Tokyo
Japanese footballers
J1 League players
Argentino de Rosario footballers
Boston River players
Shimizu S-Pulse players
Expatriate footballers in Uruguay
Association football defenders